Thorncrown Chapel is a chapel located in Eureka Springs, Arkansas, designed by E. Fay Jones, and constructed in 1980. The design recalls the Prairie School of architecture popularized by Frank Lloyd Wright, with whom Jones had apprenticed. The chapel was commissioned by Jim Reed, a retired schoolteacher, who envisioned a non-denominational pilgrimage chapel set apart for meditation. The design of Thorncrown Chapel was inspired by Sainte-Chapelle, a Gothic church in Paris, France, pierced by numerous stained glass windows. It held some of King Louis's medieval Christian relics, including the Crown of Thorns believed worn by Christ. This relic inspired the name of the American chapel.

The chapel's unusual artistry has been recognized. It was selected for the 2006 Twenty-five Year Award by the American Institute of Architects. It was listed on the National Register of Historic Places in 2000, a status not granted to buildings fewer than fifty years old unless exceptionally significant. It was included in Budget Travels list of "12 Most Beautiful Churches in America" and Bored Panda's list of "50 Most Extraordinary Churches Of The World."

Background
Resident Jim Reed, a retired schoolteacher, bought land in 1971 where he intended to commission a non-denominational pilgrimage chapel near Eureka Springs, Arkansas. He wanted it to be set apart from the city for meditation in the foothill, forested landscape. He commissioned architect E. Fay Jones to design the project. Jones said he was inspired in his design of Thorncrown Chapel by Sainte-Chapelle, a Gothic church in Paris, France. It is known for its jewel-like interior, the result of its many narrow, stained-glass windows and different types of glass that allow light into the structure.

Structure and status

It has 425 windows, which add up to 6,000 square feet (approximately 560 square meters) of glass. During the design process, Jones decided that in order to preserve the site's natural setting, no structural element could be larger than what two men could carry through the woods. The structure was constructed using organic materials indigenous to northwestern Arkansas, including pressure-treated Southern pine and flagstone for the floor and surrounding wall. The small ornamental roof skylight was later enlarged to provide additional natural lighting throughout the chapel.

The chapel looks like an open-air structure, but is, in fact, an enclosed air-conditioned space that seats up to 100 people. It is open daily from March to December with free admission. It is closed January and February except for weddings and other special events. Non-denominational church services are held in the adjoining worship center on Sundays from April to December.

Honors and awards
The chapel was selected by the American Institute of Architects for the 2006 Twenty-five Year Award, recognizing works whose value has continued. It was listed on the National Register of Historic Places in 2000, a status not granted to buildings fewer than fifty years old unless exceptionally significant.

Budget Travel included the chapel in its list of "12 Most Beautiful Churches in America" Bored Panda has it on the list of "50 Most Extraordinary Churches Of The World."

See also
 Mildred B. Cooper Memorial Chapel, similar chapel built by Jones in nearby Bella Vista, Arkansas
 National Register of Historic Places listings in Carroll County, Arkansas

References

Further reading
 Charles K. Gandee. (March 1981) "A Wayfarer's Chapel By Fay Jones", Architectural Record. Vol 169 Number 3. pp. 86–91
 Paul Heyer. (1993) American Architecture: Ideas and Ideologies in the Late Twentieth Century. New York: Van Nostrand Reinhold, pp. 102–103.

External links

 Thorncrown Chapel official website.
 Thorncrown Chapel Special Collection in the Fay Jones Collection at the University of Arkansas Library.
 Thorncrown Chapel at Great Buildings Online.
Thorncrown Chapel at the American Institute of Architects.

Churches in Arkansas
Properties of religious function on the National Register of Historic Places in Arkansas
Chapels in the United States
Churches completed in 1980
Buildings and structures in Eureka Springs, Arkansas
Tourist attractions in Carroll County, Arkansas
National Register of Historic Places in Carroll County, Arkansas